Tulin railway station is an Indian railway station situated under Ranchi railway division of the South Eastern Railway zone of the Indian Railways. It is situated beside Ranchi road at Tulin in Purulia district in the Indian state of West Bengal. It serves Tulin and nearby villages. Total 16 trains stop in Tulin railway station.

References

Railway stations in Purulia district
Ranchi railway division